Salisbury is a civil parish in Westmorland County, New Brunswick, Canada.

For governance purposes it is divided between the villages of Petitcodiac and Salisbury; the local service district of the parish of Salisbury, and the special service area of Havelock Inside which extends from the LSD of the parish of Havelock.

All governance units are members of the Southeast Regional Service Commission.

Origin of name
The origin of Salisbury's name is uncertain.

William F. Ganong states it was "perhaps" due to it extending nearly to Salisbury Bay, a former name of Rocher Bay.

The Provincial Archives of New Brunswick gives two possibilities: Sir John Salbusbury, who accompanied Edward Cornwallis on his mission to establish Nova Scotia; or Salisbury, a city in Wiltshire, England.

History
Salisbury was erected in 1787 from unassigned land west of Hillsborough, Hopewell, and Moncton Parishes.

In 1838 part of Salisbury was included in the newly erected Harvey Parish.

In 1845 Albert County was erected from Westmorland County; the county line ran through Salisbury.

In 1846 the county line with Albert was moved to its present location; the part of Salisbury south and east of the new line is transferred to Coverdale and Harvey Parishes.

In 1894 the existing boundaries of Salisbury were declared retroactive to its erection.

Boundaries
Salisbury Parish is bounded:

 on the north by the Kent County line;
 on the east beginning on the county line about 3.5 kilometres west of Route 126, at the prolongation of the eastern line of a large tract granted to Martin Gay and Associates, then southerly along the prolongation to the Petitcodiac River at a point about 200 metres upriver of the mouth of Little River, then upriver to the western line of Albert County, then along Albert County; 
 on the south by Albert County;
 on the west by the Kings County and Queens County lines.

Communities
Communities at least partly within the parish. bold indicates an incorporated municipality

 Dobsons Corner
 Fawcett
 Fawcett Hill
 Fredericton Road
 Glenvale
 Harewood
 Hicksville
 Hillgrove
 Intervale
 Kay Settlement
 Killams Mills
 Kinnear Settlement
 Lewis Mountain
 Monteagle
 North Branch
  Petitcodiac
 Petitcodiac East
  Pollett River
  River Glade
  Salisbury
 Scott Road
  Second North River
 Steeves Settlement
 The Glades
 Upper Ridge
 Wheaton Settlement

Bodies of water
Bodies of water at least partly within the parish.

 Anagance River
  Canaan River
 North River
 Petitcodiac River
 Pollett River
 Intervale Creek

Other notable places
Parks, historic sites, and other noteworthy places at least partly within the parish.
 Canaan Bog Protected Natural Area
 Canaan River Wildlife Management Area

Demographics
Parish population total does not include Petitcodiac and portion within the village of Salisbury

Population

Language
Mother tongue (2016)

Access routes
Highways and numbered routes that run through the parish, including external routes that start or finish at the parish limits:

Highways

Principal Routes

Secondary Routes:

External Routes:
None

See also
List of parishes in New Brunswick

Notes

References

Local service districts of Westmorland County, New Brunswick
Parishes of Westmorland County, New Brunswick